Birkdale (sometimes written out as Birk Dale) is a dale in the Yorkshire Dales National Park, in North Yorkshire, England. It lies at the far western end of Swaledale, close to the border with Cumbria. The dale is one of the smallest of the Yorkshire Dales. The area forms part of the civil parish of Muker.

At the eastern end of the dale the beck joins Great Sleddale Beck to become the River Swale. The dale suffered depopulation in the 1960s (like Grisedale, near to Garsdale), leaving only a few occupied farms and farmsteads.

The Coast to Coast long-distance path traverses Birkdale, leaving the B6270 at Birkdale Cross, and following an ancient track through Ravenseat to Tan Hill.

References 
 

Valleys of North Yorkshire
Yorkshire Dales